"Malibu" is a song by German singer-songwriter Kim Petras. It was released as a single on May 7, 2020.

Background and release
On May 1, 2020, Petras announced that the song would be released on May 7, 2020. Petras described the song as a "return to color, the feeling of being in love, and the escapism pop that I love the most". Petras also revealed that she "had cried all [her] tears [in the last single, 'Reminds Me' and album, Clarity] and moved on, so this is a reflection of how [she's] been feeling".

The song was included in the expansion pack The Sims 4: Eco Lifestyle with new vocals in Simlish, the fictional language spoken by Sims. Battle Royale game Fortnite also included "Malibu" in their 2021 Rainbow Royale pride event where the song would play in their Power Play radio stations used in the games cars.

The song was also featured in the June 2021 Rocket League soundtrack as both a Playlist song and as a player anthem.

Composition
Petras described the track as a "pick-me-up pop song" which displays a "punchy mix of synth-bass squirts and tropical-funk guitar that lives up to its namesake".

Reception
Desiree Guerrero from Out wrote that the track "might be the song of the summer", describing the song as "glittery, sugary, summery" which is "giving us all the fantasy pop escapism we need right now". Music critic Thomas Bleach named the song a "bonafide banger" and said it "deserves to be embraced on mainstream radio." Maxamillion Polo from Ones to Watch wrote that "'Malibu' is Petras at her finest" and called the song "a euphoric joyride from start to finish".

Music video
Petras released the song's music video on May 11, 2020 and was filmed in isolation during the COVID-19 pandemic. It features Paris Hilton, Demi Lovato, Jonathan Van Ness, Madelaine Petsch, Todrick Hall, Pabllo Vittar, Jessie J, Charli XCX, Aly & AJ, Scott Hoying, Aquaria, Loren Gray, Nikita Dragun, Amanda Lepore, Dorian Electra, Bowen Yang, Slayyyter, and Teddy Quinlivan as cameo appearances.

Live performances
Petras performed "Malibu" on Jimmy Kimmel Live! on 10 July 2020. She also performed it during HBO Pride Live along with "Heart to Break" and "Blow It All".

Charts

References 

2020 singles
2020 songs
Kim Petras songs
Songs written by Dr. Luke
Songs written by Kim Petras
Songs written by Kool Kojak
Song recordings produced by Kool Kojak
Impact of the COVID-19 pandemic on the music industry